Jonathan Judah Isaac (born October 3, 1997) is an American professional basketball player for the Orlando Magic of the National Basketball Association (NBA). He played college basketball for one season for the Florida State Seminoles.

Isaac was selected sixth overall by the Magic in the 2017 NBA draft.

High school career

Isaac first attended Barron Collier High School in Naples, Florida during his freshman and sophomore years. In his junior and senior years, he attended the International School of Broward in Hollywood, Florida. However, as a result of wanting to be reclassified as part of the high school class of 2016, Isaac also attended IMG Academy for what was considered to be a postgraduate year in 2016. As a senior in 2016, he averaged 17.6 points per game and 10.0 rebounds per game while leading IMG Academy to a 21-10 overall record. In his high school career, he grew six inches from his freshman year to his senior year, going from a combo guard of sorts to the combo forward he is today. Isaac was selected to play in the 2016 Jordan Brand Classic and Nike Hoop Summit All-Star games. Isaac was rated as a five-star recruit and ranked as the No.12 overall recruit and No.4 Small forward in the 2016 high school class. On July 5, 2015, Isaac confirmed that he was going to commit to Florida State after his senior year of high school ended.

On February 5, 2016, he announced his intention of testing the possibility of entering the 2016 NBA draft as the first American postgraduate to jump directly from high school to the NBA draft since 2005. He was also considered a prospect that could have been taken in the middle or late first round had he committed to it. Four days after making that announcement, however, Isaac confirmed that he was not going to enter the 2016 draft after all and reaffirmed his intentions of playing with Florida State for the 2016–17 season.

College career
Before the 2016–17 season began, Isaac was considered a preseason watch for the Karl Malone Award. Isaac would record his first double-double of the season with 14 points and 10 rebounds in a 100–71 win over Detroit on November 20. He'd earn the ACC Freshman of the Week award for his performances from November 15–21, 2016. On January 18, 2017, Isaac recorded 23 points, 10 rebounds, and a season-high 7 blocks in a win over the Notre Dame Fighting Irish. On February 8, 2017, Isaac scored 21 points in a 95–71 victory against the NC State Wolfpack. Throughout the season, Isaac was considered a team leader alongside fellow prospects Dwayne Bacon and Xavier Rathan-Mayes, to the point where they at one point were considered the sixth-best team of the nation. As the second seed in the ACC tournament, Florida State beat Virginia Tech in the quarterfinals, but lost to Notre Dame in the semi-finals. His team then proceeded to the NCAA Tournament, where they were seeded 3rd in the West. They won their first-round game 86–80 against FGCU at Amway Center in Orlando, Florida. However, they lost in the round of 32 in a blowout upset against 11th seeded Xavier, 91-66. Isaac scored just 25 points in two games In his NCAA Tournament career. At the conclusion of his freshman season, he was named to the All-ACC Freshman Team of 2017. In addition to that, Isaac announced his intention to forgo his final three years of collegiate eligibility and enter the 2017 NBA draft where he was projected as a lottery first round selection. He was the second player in Florida State's basketball history to leave as a one-and-done prospect, behind Malik Beasley in 2016.

Professional career

Orlando Magic (2017–present)
On June 22, 2017, Isaac was selected with the sixth overall pick in the 2017 NBA draft by the Orlando Magic. On December 28, he was ruled out with a right ankle sprain. On February 23, 2018, he was assigned to the Lakeland Magic of the NBA G League for rehabilitation purposes.

In his second year in the league, Isaac became a starter for the Magic in 64 games, posting career high averages in points, rebounds, assists, and blocks per game. On January 31, 2019, he recorded a career-high 13 rebounds in a 107–100 win over the Indiana Pacers. On February 10, he matched his career-high of 5 blocks, to go along with 17 points and 2 steals in a 124–108 win over the Atlanta Hawks. On February 12, he scored a career-high 20 points in a 118–88 win over the New Orleans Pelicans.

Isaac improved on his previous career-high in scoring by posting 24 points in a 95–104 loss to the Toronto Raptors on October 28, 2019. On January 1, 2020, he suffered a posterior lateral corner injury and a medial bone contusion in his left knee during a 122–101 win over the Washington Wizards and was expected to be sidelined for about eight to ten weeks. On August 2, Isaac suffered a torn left anterior cruciate ligament (ACL) during a 132–116 win over the Sacramento Kings hosted in the 2020 NBA Bubble. Isaac later underwent successful surgery on August 7 to repair his torn left ACL and meniscus, and was expected to miss the remainder of 2019–20 NBA season. On August 31, Magic team president Jeff Weltman confirmed Isaac would also miss the entire 2020–21 season with the injury.

On March 15, 2022, Weltman announced that Isaac would miss the remainder of the 2021–22 NBA season due to the injury. He had not yet played during the season. On March 22, Isaac suffered a minor injury to his right hamstring during his rehab and underwent a surgical procedure.

On January 10, 2023, Isaac was assigned to the Magic's G League affiliate for just one game. On January 23, he returned to the court after over two and a half years, recording 10 points, 3 rebounds, and 2 steals in 9 minutes in a 113–98 win over the Boston Celtics. On February 28, during a practice in Milwaukee, Isaac felt discomfort, and an MRI a day later revealed a torn left adductor muscle. On March 3, he underwent season-ending surgery to address the injury.

Career statistics

NBA

Regular season

|-
| style="text-align:left;"| 
| style="text-align:left;"| Orlando
| 27 || 10 || 19.9 || .379 || .348 || .760 || 3.7 || .7 || 1.2 || 1.1 || 5.4
|-
| style="text-align:left;"| 
| style="text-align:left;"| Orlando
| 75 || 64 || 26.6 || .429 || .323 || .815 || 5.5 || 1.1 || .8 || 1.3 || 9.6
|-
| style="text-align:left;"| 
| style="text-align:left;"| Orlando
| 34 || 32 || 29.2 || .470 || .340 || .779 || 6.8 || 1.4 || 1.6 || 2.3 || 11.9
|-
| style="text-align:left;"| 
| style="text-align:left;"| Orlando
| 11 || 0 || 11.3 || .415 || .400 || .556 || 4.0 || .5 || 1.3 || .4 || 5.0
|- class="sortbottom"
| style="text-align:center;" colspan="2"| Career
| 147 || 106 || 24.7 || .434 || .333 || .789 || 5.3 || 1.0 || 1.1 || 1.4 || 9.0

Playoffs

|-
| style="text-align:left;"| 2019
| style="text-align:left;"| Orlando
| 5 || 5 || 27.4 || .275 || .200 || .875 || 6.2 || .4 || .4 || 1.0 || 6.6
|- class="sortbottom"
| style="text-align:center;" colspan="2"| Career
| 5 || 5 || 27.4 || .275 || .200 || .875 || 6.2 || .4 || .4 || 1.0 || 6.6

College

|-
| style="text-align:left;"| 2016–17
| style="text-align:left;"| Florida State
| 32 || 32 || 26.2 || .508 || .348 || .780 || 7.8 || 1.2 || 1.2 || 1.5 || 12.0

Personal life
Isaac is one of six children born to Jackie Allen. He has one older sister, two older brothers, and two younger brothers. Isaac is of Puerto Rican descent due to his maternal grandfather and is eligible to play for the Puerto Rican national team. Isaac is a Christian conservative who has preached at Jump Ministries Global Church in Orlando.

In a July 31, 2020 game against the Brooklyn Nets in the NBA Bubble, Isaac was the only player to stand during the U.S. national anthem. When asked about this decision after the game, he responded, "I believe that black lives matter. A lot went into my decision ... It's my thought that kneeling or wearing a 'Black Lives Matter' t-shirt don't go hand in hand with supporting black lives." Isaac spoke at the ReAwaken America Tour on standing during the anthem and declining the COVID-19 vaccine.

Books
On May 17, 2022, Isaac's first book Why I Stand was published. In the book, Isaac shares how his Christian faith shaped his life and helped him overcome various struggles.

References

External links

 
Florida State Seminoles bio
 

1997 births
Living people
21st-century African-American sportspeople
African-American basketball players
African-American Christians
American men's basketball players
American people of Puerto Rican descent
Basketball players from Florida
Basketball players from New York City
Florida State Seminoles men's basketball players
IMG Academy alumni
Lakeland Magic players
Orlando Magic draft picks
Orlando Magic players
Power forwards (basketball)
Small forwards
Sportspeople from Naples, Florida
Sportspeople from the Bronx